Ryan Miller (born December 14, 1984) is a former American professional soccer player and coach.

Amateur career

Born in Barrington Illinois, Miller attended  Barrington High School, where he graduated in 2003 and finished his prep career with 100 points, on 36 goals and 28 assists. He attended University of Notre Dame and as a fifth year senior in 2007, he was a Second Team NSCAA All-American and earned CoSIDA First Team Academic All-American honors. He finished his time with the Fighting Irish with 86 straight starts, the most in the team's history.

During his college years, Miller also played for Chicago Fire Reserves, Nevada Wonders and Indiana Invaders in the USL Premier Development League.

Professional career
Miller was originally drafted by Columbus Crew in the third round (31st overall) of the 2008 MLS SuperDraft and made seven reserve team appearances for the club before being released. He was signed via waivers by D.C. United on September 15, 2008 and made his D.C. debut on October 1, 2008 in a CONCACAF Champions League match against Primera Division de Mexico side Cruz Azul. Miller made a total of three appearances for United, including two starts, all coming in the CONCACAF Champions League. One week into the 2009 MLS season, Miller was waived by D.C. United.

After his release by D.C., Miller went on trial with several clubs in Europe, eventually signing with Swedish Superettan side Ljungskile SK. After a short but successful stint with the club, Miller moved up a division to the Allsvenskan league with fellow Swedish club Halmstads BK, where he had trialled the previous spring. He stayed with Halmstads for three seasons and helped the club gain promotion to the Swedish top flight.

On January 21, 2013, Miller signed with Portland Timbers of Major League Soccer. He was not retained following the season.

International
On December 21, 2010, Miller was called up to the United States men's national soccer team squad by head coach Bob Bradley for a friendly against Chile, but he didn't feature in the match.

References

External links

1984 births
Living people
People from Barrington, Illinois
American soccer players
American expatriate soccer players
Association football defenders
Columbus Crew draft picks
Expatriate footballers in Sweden
Soccer players from Illinois
Sportspeople from Cook County, Illinois
Notre Dame Fighting Irish men's soccer players
Chicago Fire U-23 players
Nevada Wonders players
Indiana Invaders players
Columbus Crew players
Cleveland City Stars players
D.C. United players
Ljungskile SK players
Halmstads BK players
Portland Timbers players
USL League Two players
USL Second Division players
Superettan players
Allsvenskan players
Major League Soccer players
Portland Timbers non-playing staff